Christopher Cullen is an English sinologist. He has an MA from University of Oxford in engineering and a PhD from the School of Oriental and African Studies in classical Chinese. He is Director Emeritus of the Needham Research Institute and General Editor of the Science and Civilisation in China series, succeeding Joseph Needham. His own area of research is the Han Dynasty and he translated the Book on Numbers and Computation into English.

Publications 
 
 
 --, and Vivienne Lo, eds., Medieval Chinese Medicine: The Dunhuang Medical Manuscripts. Taylor & Francis, Needham Research Institute Series,  2004.   .

References

External links
 Christopher Cullen, "Making sense of the cosmos in ancient China," Cambridge University.

Alumni of SOAS University of London
Alumni of the University of Oxford
British sinologists
Fellows of Darwin College, Cambridge
Living people
Place of birth missing (living people)
Year of birth missing (living people)

de:Christopher Cullen